The Wolf class was a class of three sloops of wooden construction built for the Royal Navy during 1741–43. They were ordered in 1741, 1742 and 1743 respectively, and were the first to increase significantly in size from the 200 burthen tons which had been the normal size from 1728; they were to a common design prepared by Jacob Allin, the Surveyor of the Navy. For the latter two vessels, the design was modified by the addition of 6 inches to their depth in hold.

Although initially armed with ten 4-pounder guns, this class was built with eight pairs of gunports on the upper deck (each port flanked by two pairs of row-ports), and the two survivors in 1744 had their ordnance increased to fourteen guns.

Vessels

References 

McLaughlan, Ian. The Sloop of War 1650–1763. Seaforth Publishing, 2014. .
Winfield, Rif. British Warships in the Age of Sail 1714–1792: Design, Construction, Careers and Fates. Seaforth Publishing, 2007. .

Sloop classes